The 1929 Western State Teachers Hilltoppers football team represented Western State Teachers College (later renamed Western Michigan University) as an independent during the 1929 college football season.  In their first season under head coach Mike Gary, the Hilltoppers compiled a 5–2–1 record and outscored their opponents, 161 to 44. Halfback Herman Seborg was the team captain. They played their home games at Western State Teachers College Field.

Schedule

References

Western State Teachers
Western Michigan Broncos football seasons
Michigan Collegiate Conference football champion seasons
Western State Teachers Hilltoppers football